Scientific Communism (Nauchny kommunizm), as one of three major elements of Marxism, is "the science dealing with general socio-political laws and patterns, ways, forms and methods of changing society" along communist lines, according to the historical mission of the proletariat (the proletarian revolution); in other words, it is the science regarding the working-class struggle and the social revolution, about the "laws behind the building of socialism and communism, and about the world revolutionary process as a whole." In a broader sense, scientific communism can refer to Marxism as a whole; to the "scientific expression of the radical interests and objectives involved in the struggle of the working class."

It was taught in the USSR in all institutions of higher education and pursued in the corresponding research institutions and departments. The term was treated by authorities as encompassing the scientific socialism of Karl Marx and Friedrich Engels along with the theories of Vladimir Lenin and the CPSU. The discipline consisted in investigation of laws, patterns, ways and forms of class struggle, and socialist revolution, as well as the development of socialism and construction of communism.

Overview 
Passing exams in scientific communism was an obligatory prerequisite in obtaining any postgraduate scientific degree in the USSR, i.e., Candidate of Sciences. Typical courses of study included the following topics, among others:
 Origins and development of the communist theory
 Theory of socialist revolution
 International communist movement
 Dictatorship of the proletariat
 Transformation of socialism into communism
 Communist interpersonal relations and upbringing
 Criticisms of anti-communism
Other components of Marxism:
 Marxist philosophy, subdivided into dialectical materialism and historical materialism
 Political economy, subdivided into the political economy of capitalism and political economy of socialism

References

Further reading 
 Fundamentals of Scientific Communism (1977)
 A Dictionary of Scientific Communism (1984)
 What Is Scientific Communism? (1985)
 Scientific Communism (1986)

Communism
Education in the Soviet Union
Science and technology in the Soviet Union